Rafael Andrade Navarrete (February 25, 1856, Ardales – June 21, 1928) was a Spanish politician and lawyer.

He was Minister of Public instruction and Fine Arts during the reign of Alfonso XIII. As a member of the Conservative Party, he began his political career as a deputy for Teruel (province) in the elections of 1896, which he would retain in successive elections until 1920. In 1921 he was named as a senator. He was minister of Public Instruction between 25 October and 9 December 1915 and between 11 June and 3 November 1917 in individual governments presided over by Eduardo Dato. For some time he was also President of the Council of State of Spain.

1856 births
1928 deaths
People from the Province of Málaga
Conservative Party (Spain) politicians
Education ministers of Spain
Members of the Congress of Deputies of the Spanish Restoration
Members of the Senate of Spain
Politicians from Andalusia